The 12208 / 07 Jammu Tawi Kathgodam Garib Rath Express is a Superfast Express train of the Garib Rath series belonging to Indian Railways - Northern Railway zone that runs between Jammu Tawi and Kathgodam in India.  It operates as train number 12208 from Jammu Tawi to Kathgodam and as train number 12207 in the reverse direction serving the states of Uttarakhand, Uttar Pradesh, Haryana, Punjab and Jammu and Kashmir.

Coaches
The 12208 / 07 Jammu Tawi Kathgodam Garib Rath Express has 13 AC 3 tier & 2 EOG Coaches.

It does not carry a Pantry car coach. As is customary with most train services in India, Coach Composition may be amended at the discretion of Indian Railways depending on demand.

Service

Despite the average speed of the train being below , as per Indian Railways rules, its fare includes a Superfast surcharge.

Routing

The 12208 / 07 Jammu Tawi Kathgodam Garib Rath Express runs from Jammu Tawi via Ludhiana Junction, Ambala Cantt Junction, Saharanpur Junction, Laksar Junction, Moradabad, Rudrapur City to Kathgodam.

It is the only train of Indian Railways that runs between Jammu Tawi and Kathgodam.

Traction

As large sections of the route are yet to be fully electrified, a Ludhiana based WDM-3A locomotive powers the train for its entire journey.

Rake Sharing
The 12208 / 07 Jammu Tawi Kathgodam Garib Rath Express shares its rake with 12209 / 10 Kathgodam Kanpur Central Garib Rath Express as follows:

12208 Jammu Tawi Kathgodam Garib Rath Express leaves Jammu Tawi on Sunday arriving Kathgodam on Monday then

12210 Kathgodam Kanpur Central Garib Rath Express leaves Kathgodam on Monday arriving Kanpur Central on Tuesday then

12209 Kanpur Central Kathgodam Garib Rath Express leaves Kanpur Central on Tuesday arriving Kathgodam the same day then

12207 Kathgodam Jammu Tawi Garib Rath Express leaves Kathgodam on Tuesday arriving back at Jammu Tawi on Wednesday.

Operation

12208 Jammu Tawi Kathgodam Garib Rath Express leaves Jammu Tawi every Sunday and reaches Kathgodam the next day.

12207 Kathgodam Jammu Tawi Garib Rath Express leaves Kathgodam every Tuesday and reaches Jammu Tawi the next day.

References

External links
 Indian Railway Passenger Reservation Enquiry
 IRCTC Online Passenger Reservation System
 Indian Railways

Garib Rath Express trains
Rail transport in Jammu and Kashmir
Rail transport in Punjab, India
Rail transport in Haryana
Rail transport in Uttar Pradesh
Rail transport in Uttarakhand
Transport in Jammu
Railway services introduced in 2008
Transport in Haldwani-Kathgodam